Zechariah Choneh Bergner
(27 November 1893 – 20 August 1976), better known by his pen name Melech Ravitch, was a Canadian Yiddish poet and essayist. Ravitch was one of the world's leading Yiddish literary figures after the Holocaust. His poetry and essays appeared in the international Yiddish press and in anthologies, as well as in translation.

Life

Life in Poland
Bergner was born in 1893 to Efrayim and Hinde Bergner in Redem, Eastern Galicia. Leaving home at age 14, he served in the Austrian army in World War I and lived in Lemberg and Vienna. Emboldened by the 1908 Czernowitz Language Conference, he became involved in the Yiddishist movement and began writing poetry. Together with a fellow poet Shmuel Yankev Imber, he strove to promote the aesthetic ideals of neo-romanticism in Lviv Jewish literary centers, inspired by Jewish writers such as Arthur Schnitzler and Stefan Zweig. His earliest poetry appeared in Der yidisher arbeyter in 1910. Other work of the period included the 1912 collection Oyf der Shvel (On the Threshold) and 1918's Spinoza.

From the early 1920s he was an active contributor of poems and essays to major Yiddish periodicals, under the name Melech Ravitch. Moving to Warsaw in 1921, he belonged to Di Chaliastre ("The Gang"), a modernist literary group which included Uri Zvi Greenberg and Peretz Markish. He was a co-founder of the Yiddish literary journal '' and served as secretary of the Yiddish Writers' Union, which then included Sholem Asch, Isaac Bashevis Singer, and I. J. Singer.

He was a vegetarian and patron of the Jewish Vegetarian Society.

Life in Australia and Canada
Ravitch visited Australia in 1933 to investigate the feasibility of the Kimberley Plan, and moved there in 1935. After 1938, he moved to Argentina, Mexico, New York City, and Israel, before settling in Montreal, where he lived until his death. He briefly served as head of the Jewish Public Library and revived the Yidishe Folks-Universitet (Jewish People's Popular University), which he ran from 1941 to 1954. His life in Australia has been documented by Anna Epstein.

Selected publications

References

External links
 

1893 births
1976 deaths
Canadian people of Polish-Jewish descent
Canadian poets by language
Canadian publishers (people)
Jewish Canadian writers
Jews from Galicia (Eastern Europe)
Polish emigrants to Canada
Writers from Montreal
Yiddish culture in Canada
Yiddish-language journalists
Yiddish-language poets
People from Radymno
People from the Kingdom of Galicia and Lodomeria
Austro-Hungarian Jews
Austro-Hungarian military personnel of World War I